El Vendrell is a town located in the province of Tarragona, Catalonia, in the wine-growing region of Penedès.  It is wedged between the Mediterranean and the coastal range. El Vendrell is the capital of the Baix Penedès comarca and a tourist spot, with the beaches of Comarruga,  and El Vendrell.

It is the source of the Catalan family name "Vendrell".

Notable people from El Vendrell
Pablo Casals
Àngel Guimerà
Andreu Nin
Josep Nin i Tudó
Manuel Nin

Demography

Sport
The city has a roller hockey team, one of the most important in Spain, which plays in the main League OK Liga.

References

 Panareda Clopés, Josep Maria; Rios Calvet, Jaume; Rabella Vives, Josep Maria (1989). Guia de Catalunya, Barcelona: Caixa de Catalunya.  (Spanish).  (Catalan).

External links

 Government data pages 

Municipalities in Baix Penedès
Populated places in Baix Penedès